Frakull is a former municipality in the Fier County, western Albania. At the 2015 local government reform it became a subdivision of the municipality Fier. The population at the 2011 census was 6,820. One of the villages in the municipal unit is Frakull e Madhe.

Notable people
Nezim Frakulla famous bejtexhi

References 

Former municipalities in Fier County
Administrative units of Fier